Return of the Kung Fu Dragon (Mandarin:  Ju ma pao) is a 1976 Taiwanese film directed by Chick Lim Yu.

Plot summary 
On the idyllic phoenix island in the south china sea a golden city becomes the birthplace to a new form of Kung Fu. Soon an evil tyrant threatens the peace and harmony of once such a proud city. A generation passes and a brave prince, a fearless princess and a foolish dwarf with the powers of invisibility team up to return a kingdom to its people as they wrest it from the hands of the evil tyrant.

Cast

Soundtrack

References

External links 

 (dubbed in English)
 

1976 films
Taiwanese martial arts films
1970s Mandarin-language films